Convict is a 1936 Soviet drama film directed by Yevgeni Chervyakov.

Plot 
A group of prisoners arrives at the NKVD camp in the north. One of them immediately heads the hut and forbids everyone to work. Chekists will try to re-educate them.

Cast 
 Mikhail Astangov as Kostya
 Mikhail Yanshin as Max
 Boris Dobronravov as Director Gromov
 Vera Yanukova as Sonya
 Nadezhda Yermakovich as Margarita Ivanova
 Mark Bernes
 Aleksandr Cheban as Official of the G.P.U.
 Mariya Goricheva as Mother Sadovsky
 Gennadiy Michurin as Engineer Botkin
 Konstantin Nazarenko as Lemon
 Pavel Olenev as Sasha
 Boris Tamarin as Engineer Sandovsky
 Vyacheslav Novikov as Mitya (uncredited)

References

External links 
 

1936 films
Films directed by Yevgeni Chervyakov
1930s Russian-language films
Soviet drama films
Soviet black-and-white films
1936 drama films